Ofir Amram (born 19 June 1986) is an Israeli footballer playing for Nordia Jerusalem.

Honours
Liga Artzit (1):
2007-08

External links
Player profile at IFA

1986 births
Living people
Israeli footballers
Hapoel Jerusalem F.C. players
Maccabi Netanya F.C. players
Beitar Jerusalem F.C. players
Maccabi Herzliya F.C. players
Nordia Jerusalem F.C. players
Footballers from Jerusalem
Liga Leumit players
Israeli Premier League players
Association football midfielders